All types of floods can occur in California, though 90 percent of them are caused by river flooding in lowland areas. Such flooding generally occurs as a result of excessive rainfall, excessive snowmelt, excessive runoff, levee failure, poor planning or built infrastructure, or a combination of these factors. Below is a list of flood events that were of significant impact to California.

A 2022 study found that Climate change in California, is likely to increase the extremity of water cycle events such as droughts and megafloods, greatly increasing the severity of future floods due to atmospheric rivers. In part this is due to the fact that the Sierra Nevada mountains, which typically retain water as snow, will no longer be as cold.

Early historic record 

Geologic evidence indicates that "megafloods" occurred in the California region in the following years A.D.: 212, 440, 603, 1029, c. 1300, 1418, 1605, 1750.  Prior to European settlement, these early floods predominantly affected the indigenous peoples of California.

California flood of 1605 

In 1605, present-day California was subject to massive flooding due to an unusually powerful atmospheric river.  This was potentially the largest flooding event of the prior 2,000 years.

1800–1899

Los Angeles flood of 1825 
This flood changed the course of the Los Angeles River from its western outlet into Santa Monica Bay following the course of Ballona Creek to a southern outlet at San Pedro Bay near where it is today.

January 1850
In January 1850, a major flood devastated the new city of Sacramento; rain from heavy storms saturated the ground upon which Sacramento was built, and the American and Sacramento rivers crested simultaneously.

Years closely following January 1850
Many subsequent floods occurred following 1850 in Sacramento and other low-lying cities along the Sierra-originating rivers, caused by hydraulic mining in the foothills. Malakoff Diggins was one example, in which silt runoff purportedly raised the river beds in the valley below by an additional two feet. Hydraulic gold mining, widespread at the time, would eventually be eliminated by the California Legislature.

October 1858: Schooner-beaching storm surge in San Diego

December 1861 – January 1862: California's Great Flood

Beginning on December 24, 1861, and lasting for 45 days, the largest flood in California's recorded history occurred, reaching full flood stage in different areas between January 9–12, 1862. State government was forced to relocate from the capital in Sacramento for 18 months in San Francisco.
The Los Angeles basin was flooded from the San Gabriel Mountains to the Palos Verdes Peninsula, at variable depths, excluding the higher lands which became islands until the waters receded. The Los Angeles basin lost 200,000 cattle by way of drowning, as well as homes, ranches, farm crops & vineyards being swept-away.

1900–1949

1909: California flood
The storm extended from Fort Ross along the Sacramento River up to the Feather River basin. The flood episodes of 1907 and 1909 in California resulted in an overhaul of planned statewide flood control designs.

March 1928: St. Francis Dam disaster 

A recently constructed dam collapsed 40 miles northwest of downtown Los Angeles. The flooding beneath the dam killed at least 431 people, and probably more.

December 1933 – January 1934: Crescenta Valley flood

In the last week of December 1933,  of rain fell in the communities of La Crescenta, La Cañada and Montrose just north of Los Angeles.  On New Year's Eve, more rain fell.  The result was a flood of mud and water that began around midnight, destroying more than 400 homes in this area.  This was commemorated in Woody Guthrie's song "Los Angeles New Year's Flood".  As a result of this flood, the Army Corps of Engineers and the County of Los Angeles built a flood control system of catch basins and concrete storm drains to prevent a repeat of the disaster.

February 1937: Santa Ana flood
The storm of February 4–7, 1937 resulted in the highest four-day rainfall totals at several stations in the Santa Ana River basin. Other stations also received high amounts of rain within those four days.

December 1937: Northeast California flood
The storm of December 1937 was a high-elevation event in the northeast corner of the state.

February–March 1938: Los Angeles Flood of 1938

September 1939: Los Angeles River

1950 – 1999

November 1950: California flood
A statewide disaster was declared November 21 when floods caused 9 deaths and $32 million in damage.

December 1955: California flood
The storm affected the central Sierra and South Bay areas. The Eel River on the North Coast saw the greatest flow of record to that time while Central Valley rivers saw near-record flows.  A statewide disaster was declared, with the storm resulting in 74 deaths and $200 million in economic losses. The heaviest 24-hour rainfall was recorded on December 20, when  fell in Shasta County. The storm's toll on Sutter County was severe. At 12:04 a.m. on December 24, 1955, a levee on the west bank of the Feather River, at Shanghai Bend, collapsed and a wall of water 21 feet high entered the county, flooding 90 percent of Yuba City and the farmlands in the southern Yuba City basin. Some 600 people were rescued by helicopter and 37 people drowned.

October 1962: Columbus Day Flood
The storm caused widespread damage in the Pacific Northwest and British Columbia.

March 1964: North Coast California tsunami
The 1964 Alaska earthquake caused a tsunami in March, completely devastating several North Coast towns and resulting in 14 deaths and an economic loss of $14 million in Del Norte County alone.

December 1964: California flood

The six days from December 19–24, 1964 were the wettest ever recorded at many stations on the North Coast.  Every major stream in the North Coast produced new high values of extreme peak flows. 34 California counties were declared disaster areas.

September 1976: Hurricane Kathleen (Ocotillo flash flood)

Hurricane Kathleen was a tropical cyclone that had a destructive impact in California. On September 7, 1976, a tropical depression formed; two days later it accelerated north towards the Baja California Peninsula. Kathleen brushed the Pacific coast of the peninsula as a hurricane on September 9 and made landfall as a fast-moving tropical storm the next day. With its circulation intact and still a tropical storm, Kathleen headed north into the United States and affected California and Arizona. Kathleen finally dissipated late on September 11.

Damage in the United States was considerable. California received record rainfall, with over a foot of rain falling in some areas. Flooding caused catastrophic destruction to Ocotillo, and six people drowned. Flooding extended west; railway tracks were destroyed in Palm Desert and high winds and severe flooding were recorded in Arizona. Overall, the damage total was $160 million (1976 USD) and 12 deaths were attributed to the storm.

August 1977: Hurricane Doreen
Hurricane Doreen and its remnants caused severe flooding in northwestern Mexico and the southwestern United States. In Mexico, heavy rainfall was reported on both Baja California and the mainland of Mexico. Flooding left 2,000 people homeless in Mexicali along the United States-Mexico border, in addition, 325 homes and businesses were destroyed in southern California. Several highways were also flooded during the passage of the storm, most notably, lanes on Interstate 8 and Interstate 15 were washed out. In San Diego and Imperial County, the total damage to agricultural interests was $25 million (1977 USD). In addition, eight fatalities were reported in California. Elsewhere, impact from Doreen was relatively light.

January 1982: Northern California flood
Heavy rainfall in the San Francisco Bay region on January 3–5 triggered thousands of debris flows from Santa Cruz Country to Contra Costa and Sonoma Counties, as well as flooding along the San Lorenzo River, Soquel Creek, and Aptos Creek in Santa Cruz County. Floods along creeks in Marin County plus added significant amounts of sediment to Tomales Bay. The landslides caused at least $66 million in damage. Landslides caused 25 of the 33 storm-caused deaths. Total estimated storm-related losses were $280 million.

1986 California and Western Nevada floods
On February 11, 1986, a vigorous low pressure system drifted east out of the Pacific, creating a Pineapple Express that lasted through February 24 unleashing unprecedented amounts of rain on northern California and western Nevada. The nine-day storm over California constituted half of the average annual rainfall for the year. Record flooding occurred in three streams that drain to the southern part of the San Francisco Bay area. Extensive flooding occurred in the Napa and Russian rivers. Napa, north of San Francisco, recorded their worst flood to this time while nearby Calistoga recorded  of rain in 10 days, creating a once-in-a-thousand-year rainfall event. Records for 24-hour rain events were reported in the Central Valley and in the Sierra. Thousand-year rainfalls were recorded in the Sierras. The heaviest 24-hour rainfall ever recorded in the Central Valley at  occurred on February 17 at Four Trees in the Feather River basin. System breaks in the Sacramento River basin included disastrous levee breaks in the Olivehurst and Linda area on the Feather River. In the San Joaquin River basin and the Delta, levee breaks along the Mokelumne River caused flooding in the community of Thornton and the inundation of four Delta islands. Lake Tahoe rose  as a result of high inflow.

The California flood resulted in 13 deaths, 50,000 people evacuated and over $400 million in property damage.  3000 residents of Linda joined in a class action lawsuit Paterno v. State of California, which eventually reached the California Supreme Court in 2004.  The California high court affirmed the District Court of Appeal's decision that said California was liable for millions of dollars in damages.

January and March 1995:  California flood
During the events of January and March 1995, over 100 stations recorded their greatest 1-day rainfalls in that station's history. The major brunt of the January storms hit the Sacramento River Basin and resulted in small stream flooding primarily due to storm drainage system failures, though flooding affected nearly every part of the state. The Salinas River exceeded its previous measured record crest by more than four feet, which was within a foot or two of the reputed crest of the legendary 1862 flood.  The Napa River set a new peak record, and the Russian and Pajaro rivers approached their record peaks.  28 people were killed and the flood cost $1.8 billion.

January 1997: Merced River flood

A series of extratropical storms, powered by the subtropical jet stream and the pineapple express, struck northern California from late December 1996 to early January 1997. December 1996 was one of the wettest Decembers on record. The Klamath River on California's North Coast experienced significant flooding which led to the river permanently changing course in some areas. The Klamath National Forest experienced its worst flood since 1974. Unprecedented flows from rain surged into the Feather River basin while melted snow surged into the San Joaquin River basin. The Cosumnes River, a tributary to the San Joaquin River, bore the brunt of the flooding. Sacramento was spared, though levee failures flooded Olivehurst, Arboga, Wilton, Manteca, and Modesto. Massive landslides in the Eldorado National Forest east of Sacramento closed U.S. Route 50. Damages totaled US$35 million (1997 dollars).

Levee failures due to breaks or overtopping in the Sacramento River Basin resulted in extensive damages. In the San Joaquin River Basin, dozens of levees failed throughout the river system and produced widespread flooding. The Sacramento-San Joaquin River Delta also experienced several levee breaks and levee overtopping.  48 counties were declared disaster areas, including all 46 counties in northern California. Over 23,000 homes and businesses, agricultural lands, bridges, roads and flood management infrastructures – valued at about $2 billion – were damaged. Nine people were killed and 120,000 people were evacuated from their homes.   were flooded, including the Yosemite Valley, which flooded for the first time since 1861–62.

February 1998: Palo Alto Flood
The storm caused damage in urbanized areas of East Palo Alto and the surrounding cities in the flood plain of the San Francisquito Creek.

2000–present
California experienced significant flooding events due to oceanic activity in 2005, 2014, 2017, 2022, and 2023.

Los Angeles County flood of 2005

The Los Angeles County flood of 2005 was the first large flood in Los Angeles County since 1938. It affected communities near the Los Angeles River and areas ranging from Santa Barbara County in the north to Orange and San Diego Counties in the south, as well as Riverside and San Bernardino Counties to the east. Large amounts of rain in January caused the Los Angeles River basin to overflow. The Ventura, Santa Ynez, and Santa Clara Rivers also flooded.

August 2014: Coastal flooding due to "Big Wednesday" wave action

2017 California floods

January 2017: Russian River flooding
The Russian River near Sacramento, California rose three feet above flood stage, overspreading about 500 houses with water. Dams were opened to relieve pressure from built-up floodwaters, with the Sacramento Weir being opened for the first time in eleven years. Numerous areas in Northern California closed roads to flood and mudslide conditions, with U.S. Route 395 temporarily closed heading in both directions. Over 570,000 customers of the Pacific Gas and Electric Company lost power in Northern and Central California during the event. Over 3,000 people in the Guerneville area were evacuated.

The high-amplitude ridge off the West Coast that characterized the preceding drought was replaced by a persistent presence of anomalous troughs impacting California. Another feature in the 2013–2015 winters was the extreme temperature contrast between a warm western U.S. and a cold eastern continent. These anomalous temperature and circulation patterns were referred to as the North American winter “dipole”. Figure (a) shows the climatological geopotential height (Z) overlaid with its eddy component, in which the dipole centers are located (indicated by X and +). The dipole basically describes the wintertime stationary waves over North America, which contribute to the mean temperature difference between the climatologically warmer western U.S. and colder eastern half. Therefore, an amplification of the stationary wave would enhance such a temperature difference, like in 2013–2015 winters, while a weakening of the stationary wave would reverse the situation, like in 2016–2017 winter. Indeed, in winter 2016–2017 this dipole was apparently reversed.

February 2017: Oroville Dam spillway failures

2022–2023 California floods

See also
 El Niño–Southern Oscillation
 Floods in the United States before 1900
 Floods in the United States (1900–1999)
 Floods in the United States (2000–present)
 ARkStorm

References

External links
A Half Century of Watching California Floods
California 2006 Storms and Flooding 
California's Historic Floods
El Niño and La Niña: Their Relationship to California Flood Damage
 California Awareness Floodplain Maps from the California Department of Water Resources
Approximate areas of the Coast, Transverse, and Peninsular Ranges affected by damaging rainstorms Table 1.1 (pages 10–11) in U.S. Geological Survey Professional Paper |issue=1434.

 
California

Natural history of California
Water in California